= Jebamalai Vinanchiarachi =

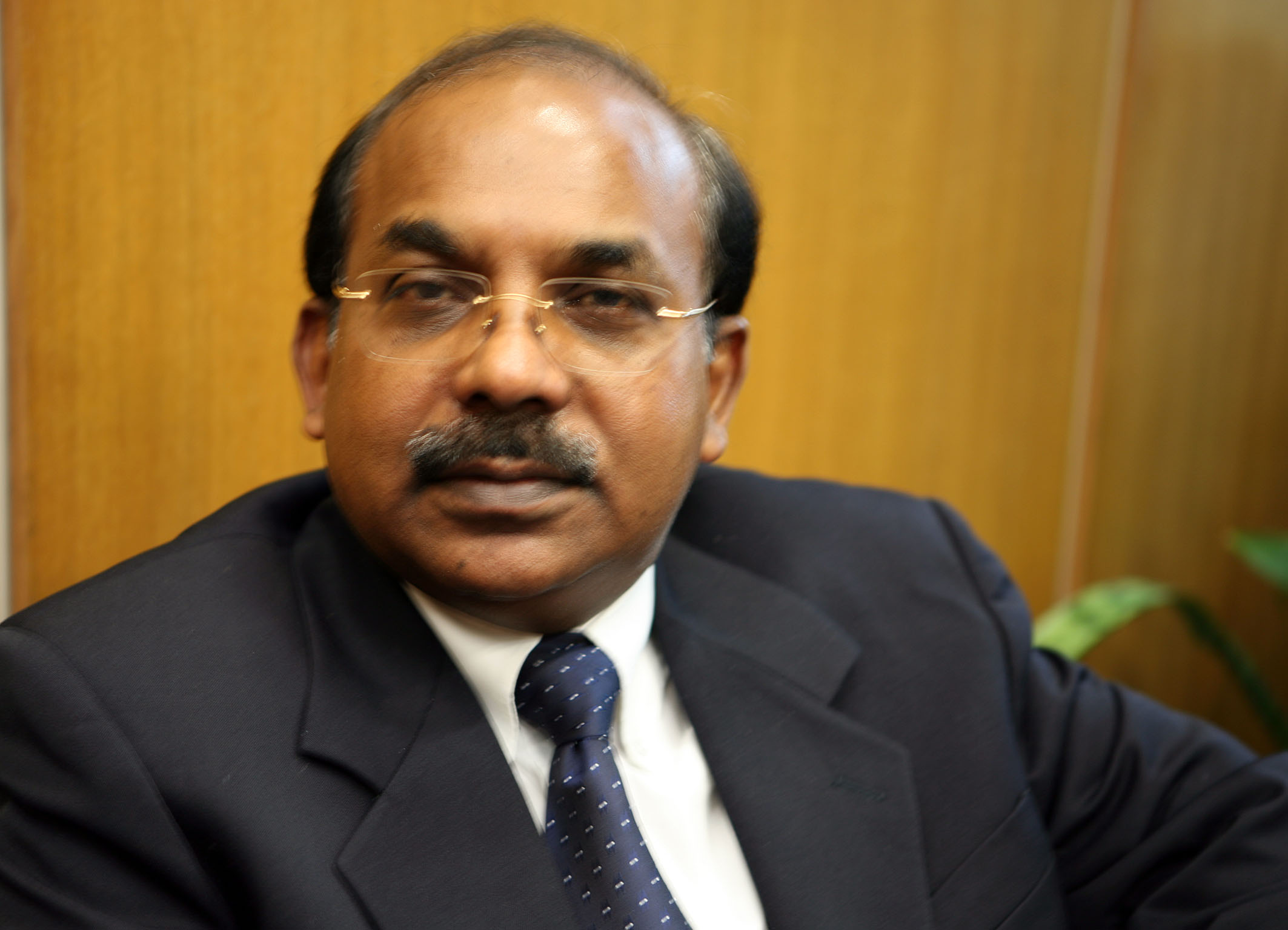
- Born: Kaniyakumari
- Education: Loyola College, University of Madras, St Joseph's Trichy
- Occupations: Economist, former United Nations official, writer, analyst

Jebamalai Vinanchiarachi (commonly known as Arachi) is an India-born economist.

== Education ==
Vinanchiarachi completed his PhD from the University of Madras, Tamil Nadu. He is an alumnus of several academic institutions in South India.

- 1986–1989: Ph.D. Economics, University of Madras, Chennai, India
- 1978–1979: MPhil. Economics, University of Madras, Chennai, India
- 1977–1978: D.H.Ed.Education, University of Madras, Chennai, India
- 1968–1970: M.A. Economics, St. Joseph's College, Trichy, India
- 1964–1967: B.A. Economics, St. Xavier's College, Tirunelveli, India

== Career ==
Vinanchiarachi worked as Senior Economist with the United Nations Industrial Development Organization (UNIDO) from 1987 to 2009. He was the UNIDO Country Representative to Sudan, Djiubouti and Yemen from 2003–2006. His years in Sudan were marked by contribution to industrial development in North Africa and increased South-South economic cooperation.

He served as the Principal Advisor to the Director General of UNIDO based in Vienna, Austria from 2006 to 2009. Vinanchiarachi is a speaker on development issues and has given numerous speeches at the United Nations and academic institutions. He has received numerous awards at an international level. In January 2012, he received recognition as the 'Outstanding Non-Resident Indian contribution on an International level' from the Global Indian Association in Dubai, UAE. He is also the recipient of the dynamic Indian of the Millennium given by the KG Foundation. In October 2018 the Auckland-based Indian Newslink gave him a commemorative award for his distinguished contribution to the international community.

Between 2010 and 2012, Vinanchiarachi was a visiting fellow at the University of Malaya in Kuala Lumpur, Malaysia. He was appointed as Director, Cleemis School of Management Studies, Thiruvananthapuram between 2013–14. Since 2016 he has been acting as the Chairman of the Experience Foundation, South India. He continues to engage in international consultancy work for the United Nations and partner organisations and lectures at academic institutions internationally on business futurology, the new industrial era, patterns of development, and innovation systems. Jebamalai Vinanchiarachi won several distinctions and awards. He won the coveted Raja Sir Annamalai Chettiar Gold Medal from St. Joseph's College, Trichy, India, for being the best outgoing student of M.A. Economics in 1969. He was awarded twice UNIDO Director General's award for outstanding performance and professional excellence. The Vienna-based Kerala Community gave him a life-time achievement award as a great scholar and gentle helper. A similar life-time achievement award was given to him by the management of Pioneer Kumarasamy College, Nagercoil, where he started his career as a lecturer in 1970, for professional excellence. At the first World Tamil Economic Conference, he was honoured with the coveted award "Tamil Crown Jewel of the World". He is also the recipient of the 2013 Global Indian Association Award for International Excellence. The KG foundation recently conferred the "Dynamic Indian of the Millennium Award" upon him. In October 2018, the Indian Newslink, Auckland, New Zealand, honoured him with a special commemorative award for his distinguished services to international communities and the Indian Diaspora.

Much of Vinanchiarachi's work centers around sustainable development and sectoral innovation systems. Areas of specialization include new sources of dynamic growth, sustainable sources of livelihoods, and determinants of competitiveness, national industrial innovation systems, private sector development and institutional capacity building for strengthening national and sectoral innovation systems. After retiring from UNIDO, he worked briefly for the Asian Development Bank (ADB), as an expert on cluster networking. Currently working on the rapidly changing facets of the new industrial revolution, in co-authorship with a few experts, which will soon be published as a book by UNIDO. Recently coined the syllabus for a new subject called "Business Futurology" for the students of management. He briefly served as an expert for EGMs organized by the knowledge management unit of the International Atomic Energy Agency (IAEA), Vienna, Austria, and made scholarly inputs to non-nuclear energy innovation systems. He also worked as a lead consultant for the UN FAO, Rome, Italy, on an operational strategy paper for fostering agribusiness in Syria and Oman.

== Writings ==
Vinanchiarachi has authored and co-authored more than a hundred articles and reports on industrial growth, South-South cooperation, trade liberalization in South-east Asia and sustainable growth models for newly industrializing countries. Most notable books include:

- India's Time
- Myths and Realities of East Asian Model of Development
- Demand Analysis
- Rethinking Development Realities
- Intervene to Industrialize (co-author)
- The Poverty of Economic Thinking
- In Joy and Sorrow
- Ethics in Politics: Then and Now
- Technology and Jobs: Fear or Fear Not
